Ore's theorem is a result in graph theory proved in 1960 by Norwegian mathematician Øystein Ore. It gives a sufficient condition for a graph to be Hamiltonian, essentially stating that a graph with sufficiently many edges must contain a Hamilton cycle. Specifically, the theorem considers the sum of the degrees of pairs of non-adjacent vertices: if every such pair has a sum that at least equals the total number of vertices in the graph, then the graph is Hamiltonian.

Formal statement
Let  be a (finite and simple) graph with  vertices. Then, Ore's theorem states that if

then  is Hamiltonian.

Proof

It is equivalent to show that every non-Hamiltonian graph  does not obey condition (∗).

Algorithm
 describes the following simple algorithm for constructing a Hamiltonian cycle in a graph meeting Ore's condition.

Arrange the vertices arbitrarily into a cycle, ignoring adjacencies in the graph.
While the cycle contains two consecutive vertices vi and vi + 1 that are not adjacent in the graph, perform the following two steps:
Search for an index j such that the four vertices vi, vi + 1, vj, and vj + 1 are all distinct and such that the graph contains edges from vi to vj and from vj + 1 to vi + 1
Reverse the part of the cycle between vi + 1 and vj (inclusive).

Each step increases the number of consecutive pairs in the cycle that are adjacent in the graph, by one or two pairs (depending on whether vj and vj + 1 are already adjacent), so the outer loop can only happen at most n times before the algorithm terminates, where n is the number of vertices in the given graph. By an argument similar to the one in the proof of the theorem, the desired index j must exist, or else the nonadjacent vertices vi and vi + 1 would have too small a total degree. Finding i and j, and reversing part of the cycle, can all be accomplished in time O(n). Therefore, the total time for the algorithm is O(n2), matching the number of edges in the input graph.

Related results
Ore's theorem is a generalization of Dirac's theorem that, when each vertex has degree at least , the graph is Hamiltonian. For, if a graph meets Dirac's condition, then clearly each pair of vertices has degrees adding to at least .

In turn Ore's theorem is generalized by the Bondy–Chvátal theorem. One may define a closure operation on a graph in which, whenever two nonadjacent vertices have degrees adding to at least , one adds an edge connecting them; if a graph meets the conditions of Ore's theorem, its closure is a complete graph. The Bondy–Chvátal theorem states that a graph is Hamiltonian if and only if its closure is Hamiltonian; since the complete graph is Hamiltonian, Ore's theorem is an immediate consequence.

 found a version of Ore's theorem that applies to directed graphs. Suppose a digraph G has the property that, for every two vertices u and v, either there is an edge from u to v or the outdegree of u plus the indegree of v equals or exceeds the number of vertices in G. Then, according to Woodall's theorem, G contains a directed Hamiltonian cycle. Ore's theorem may be obtained from Woodall by replacing every edge in a given undirected graph by a pair of directed edges. A closely related theorem by  states that an n-vertex strongly connected digraph with the property that, for every two nonadjacent vertices u and v, the total number of edges incident to u or v is at least 2n − 1 must be Hamiltonian.

Ore's theorem may also be strengthened to give a stronger conclusion than Hamiltonicity as a consequence of the degree condition in the theorem. Specifically, every graph satisfying the conditions of Ore's theorem is either a regular complete bipartite graph or is pancyclic .

References
.
.
.
.
.

Extremal graph theory
Theorems in graph theory
Articles containing proofs
Hamiltonian paths and cycles